Dimitri Isayev may refer to:
 Dimitri Isayev (1905–1930), Chuvash writer and critic
 Dimitri Isayev (born 1973), Russian actor